WKKG (101.5 FM, "Indiana Country 101.5 WKKG") is a commercial FM radio station broadcasting a country music radio format. Licensed to Columbus, Indiana, the station serves the South-Central Indiana area.  It is owned by White River Broadcasting Co. Inc.

History

In 1958, the station signed on as WCSI-FM, the sister station to WCSI 1010 AM.  WCSI-FM was powered at 20,000 watts, less than half its current output.  The two stations largely simulcast their programming.  By the early 1980s, WCSI and WCSI-FM were airing separate programming.

It became WKKG-FM in 1983.  The transmitter effective radiated power (ERP) was increased to 50,000 watts in 1987.

References

External links
 
 

Country radio stations in the United States
KKG